Runaway Girls is a lost 1928 silent film drama directed by Mark Sandrich and starring Shirley Mason and Hedda Hopper. It was produced by Harry Cohn and distributed by his Columbia Pictures, then a fledgling studio.

Cast
Shirley Mason as Sue Hartley
Arthur Rankin as Jim Grey
Hedda Hopper as Mrs. Hartley
Alice Lake as Agnes Brady
George Irving as John Hartley
Edward Earle as Varden

References

External links
 Runaway Girls at IMDb.com

 lobby card(archived)

1928 films
American silent feature films
Columbia Pictures films
Films directed by Mark Sandrich
Lost American films
1928 drama films
American black-and-white films
Silent American drama films
1928 lost films
Lost drama films
1920s American films